George Newton may refer to:

George Newton, 1st Baron Eltisley (1879–1942), British Conservative politician
George Newton (speedway rider) (1913–1984), English international speedway rider
George Newton (minister) (1602–1681), English ejected nonconformist minister
George Newton (clergyman), American Presbyterian minister sometimes credited with naming Mount Pisgah in North Carolina
George Newton (weightlifter) (1936–2016), international weightlifter
George Newton, a character in the film series Beethoven